Listrostachys is a genus of flowering plants from the orchid family, Orchidaceae. Many species have been placed in the genus over the years, most of them now transferred to other groups. At present (June 2014), only one species remains in the genus: Listrostachys pertusa. It is native to tropical Africa from Sierra Leone to Congo-Kinshasa.

See also 
 List of Orchidaceae genera

References 

 Reichenbach, H.G. (1852) Botanische Zeitung (Berlin) 10: 930.
 Berg Pana, H. (2005) Handbuch der Orchideen-Namen. Dictionary of Orchid Names. Dizionario dei nomi delle orchidee. Ulmer, Stuttgart
 Pridgeon, A.M., Cribb, P., Chase, M.W. & Rasmussen, F.N. (Eds) (2014) Genera Orchidacearum Volume 6: Epidendroideae (Part 3); page 404 ff., Oxford: Oxford University Press.

External links 

Angraecinae
Monotypic Epidendroideae genera
Vandeae genera
Orchids of Africa